Bert Potter may refer to:

 Bert Potter (1925–2012), co-creator of the New Zealand commune Centrepoint
 Bert Potter (composer) (1874–1930), composer of popular songs